Ciliopagurus tricolor is a species of hermit crab native to Madagascar. It is one of four species in the "strigatus complex", having morphological similarities to C. strigatus, with the most prominent variance being coloration.

References

Hermit crabs
Crustaceans described in 1995